Théodore Ladron (born 9 November 1908, date of death unknown) was a French racing cyclist. He rode in the 1935 Tour de France.

References

1908 births
Year of death missing
French male cyclists
Place of birth missing